Zana is a 2019 Kosovan thriller drama film directed by Antoneta Kastrati. It was selected as the Kosovan entry for the Best International Feature Film at the 92nd Academy Awards, but it was not nominated.

Plot
Haunted by her long suppressed past and pressured by family to seek treatment from mystical healers for her infertility, a Kosovar woman struggles to reconcile the expectations of motherhood with a legacy of wartime brutality.

Cast
 Adriana Matoshi as Lume
 Astrit Kabashi as Ilir
 Fatmire Sahiti as Remzije
 Mensur Safaqiu as imam Murat
 Irena Cahani as Sorceress

See also
 List of submissions to the 92nd Academy Awards for Best International Feature Film
 List of Kosovan submissions for the Academy Award for Best International Feature Film

References

External links
 

2019 films
2019 thriller drama films
2019 thriller films
2019 drama films
Kosovan drama films
Albanian-language films

Kosovan thriller films
Kosovan thriller drama films